Juan B. Fernandez-Badillo (August 28, 1912 – October 16, 1989) was a United States district judge of the United States District Court for the District of Puerto Rico.

Education and career

Born in Aguadilla, Puerto Rico, Fernandez-Badillo received a Bachelor of Arts degree from the University of Puerto Rico in 1942 and a Bachelor of Laws from the University of Puerto Rico School of Law in 1945. He entered public service in the office of the Commonwealth Attorney General of Puerto Rico, first as an assistant from 1947 to 1952, then as acting Attorney General from 1952 to 1953, then as a deputy from 1953 to 1956, and finally as the Attorney General of Puerto Rico from 1957 to 1958. He was acting Governor of Puerto Rico in 1958, and was thereafter the Solicitor General of Puerto Rico from 1959 to 1967.

Federal judicial service

In 1966, the United States Congress passed an act reorganizing the United States District Court for the District of Puerto Rico as an Article III court, with the judges thereof having life tenure and salary protection. Fernandez-Badillo was nominated by President Lyndon B. Johnson on September 18, 1967, to the United States District Court for the District of Puerto Rico, to a new seat authorized by 80 Stat. 764. He was confirmed by the United States Senate on October 12, 1967, and received his commission the same day. He assumed senior status due to a certified disability on June 30, 1972. His service terminated on October 16, 1989, due to his death.

See also
List of Hispanic/Latino American jurists

References

Sources
 

1912 births
1989 deaths
People from Aguadilla, Puerto Rico
University of Puerto Rico alumni
Hispanic and Latino American judges
Puerto Rico Attorneys General
Governors of Puerto Rico
Judges of the United States District Court for the District of Puerto Rico
United States district court judges appointed by Lyndon B. Johnson
20th-century American judges
20th-century American lawyers